Wilson Edwards was the name of an alleged Swiss biologist who was quoted by multiple Chinese news media in July 2021 condemning the United States over issues related to the investigations into the origin of COVID-19. The name went viral and prompted widespread discussion when the Swiss Embassy in China denied the existence of this individual, rejecting the news as fake. The Chinese media involved includes China News Service, Global Times, Xinhua, People's Daily, Guancha.cn, CCTV News, and CCP News Web, which are all Chinese state-owned media.

In addition to media, many institutions of the Chinese Communist Party (CCP) or the Chinese government, including the Central Commission for Discipline Inspection, National Supervisory Commission and Chinese Embassy in East Timor posted such news on their websites.

Summary

Wilson Edwards condemning the United States

In July 2021, many Chinese state-owned media, including People's Daily, China News Service, Xinhua News Agency, Global Times and CCTV News quoted many times a social media speech related to Investigations into the origin of COVID-19 from a man claiming himself as a Swiss biologist named Wilson Edwards. The speech said, "Over the past 6 months, especially after the phase I study, WHO sources and a number of fellow researchers complained that they had endured enormous pressure and even intimidation from the U.S. side as well as certain media outlets", and "I was informed that U.S. was seeking to discredit the qualifications of those scientists involved in phase I study, and overturn the conclusions of the first phase report".

Declaration of Swiss Embassy in China 

As this speech was repeatedly quoted from late July to early August in 2021, it soon aroused the attention of Swiss Embassy in China. After investigation, the Swiss authority published a declaration on Twitter on 10 Aug, indicating the news regarding the Swiss biologist Wilson Edwards might be fake. The declaration also includes three clarifications:

While posting this declaration, the Swiss Embassy also claimed to be "Looking for Wilson Edwards" and said "If you exist, we would like to meet you!". However, such an attempt might fail very soon, as the Facebook of "Wilson Edwards" was cancelled a couple of hours after the declaration. Most media that have cited the speech took down the news, but few published a corrigendum as requested by the Swiss Embassy. While some media or government institutions did not remove the news or reports.

This fake new could be dated as early as 27 July, when Voice of South Pacific, a mobile phone APP made by Chinese in Fiji posted a news in English. This news referred Wilson Edwards as a Swiss biologist. On 28 July, guancha.cn, a Chinese media, reposted the speech of Wilson Edwards on Facebook, as according to the news of Voice of South Pacific, with detailed commentary. On 31 July, Reference News reposted the news as well, and the news was further reposted to many famous media including Xinhua News Agency. However, the first pieces of news involves many mistakes of fact, for example, calling Voice of South Pacific an American media. According to App Store and Google Play Store, the developers of Voice of South Pacific APP belongs to China News Service, which is under the State Council and the CCP Propaganda Department.

Influence of the event 
After the declaration of the Swiss Embassy, the media involved were soon accused as forging the Swiss researcher Wilson Edwards, which does not exist, for political purposes. Some accused the involved media and government institutions were spreading fake news or rumors. It also said "Wilson" is a typical Anglo surname, being unlikely to be a given name, let alone a Swiss name. Fang Zhouzi believed that this name is the reverse of American biologist Edward Wilson, and the reports were rough re-import of foreign propaganda of China, which reduced those media involved to international jokes. Some netizens, fugitively on Weibo, criticized CCP producing fake news.

Hu Xijin, editor in chief of Global Times, one of the involved media, posted on Weibo on 11 Aug. He argued that it is not reasonable to determine that Chinese media cited a "fake account" solely by the declaration of Swiss Embassy. He believed, the speech of Wilson Edwards was reasonable and was an example of scientists under the pressure of the U.S. and some media, daring not to speak in their real names.

However, Hu's comment aroused further challenges, as a Swiss biologist may reasonably employ a Swiss alias rather than an Anglo one. Some netizens believe Hu was just greenwashing for those media.

Aftereffects

Facebook Investigation 
On 1 Dec 2021, Meta Platforms, the holding company of Facebook found after investigation that, such event of fake news under the name Wilson Edwards was related to Chinese tech companies and employees of Chinese state-owned enterprises. Meta Platforms said that Facebook had deleted accounts that had been used by China to fake "the Swiss biologist". As part of the investigation, Facebook deleted the account of Edwards in August, and deleted 524 Facebook accounts, 20 pages, 4 groups and 86 Instagram accounts, Meta Platforms associated such activities with individuals located in Mainland China, including employees of Sichuan Silence Information Technology Company Limited, a Chinese company in Sichuan, and some individuals related to Chinese infrastructure companies. Meta Platforms did not found the tech company associated with Chinese government, while the tech company, on their websites, describes itself in the field of network and information security, and provide security services to Ministry of Public Security. Meta Platforms said that Edwards' Facebook account made a post 10 hours after its creation, claiming that he was told the U.S. was trying to defame WHO scientists cooperating with China to investigate the origin of COVID-19, and the holder of this account used VPN to hide its location. Meta found in investigation that the original post of this account was shared and liked by fake accounts, but reposted by real users, the majority of which are employees of Chinese state-owned infrastructure companies. Meta concluded that such a propaganda activity targeting English speakers in the U.S. and the U.K., and the Chinese speakers in Taiwan, Hong Kong and Tibet was not successfully in general, as no evidence showed it was attractive in the real communities.

See also 

 Fake News
 Investigations into the origin of COVID-19
 COVID-19 misinformation by China

References 

Fake news